Parawixia is a genus of orb-weaver spiders first described by F. O. Pickard-Cambridge in 1904. Most species are found in the Neotropics but one species, Parawixia dehaani, is found in Australasia and tropical Asia as far west as India.

Natural history
Parawixia audax, one of the better known species, makes a large loose web, placing itself either in the center with its head down or in a retreat created from a rolled-leaf.

Parawixia bistriata builds its webs much higher from the ground, frequently found on telephone poles. It is known to be social, and all individuals in a colony are of the same age and size. During the day, they share a retreat where they cluster together.

Species
 it contains thirty-one species:
Parawixia acapulco Levi, 1992 – Mexico
Parawixia audax (Blackwall, 1863) – Colombia to Argentina
Parawixia barbacoas Levi, 1992 – Colombia, Ecuador
Parawixia bistriata (Rengger, 1836) – Brazil, Bolivia, Paraguay, Argentina
Parawixia casa Levi, 1992 – Colombia
Parawixia chubut Levi, 2001 – Chile, Argentina
Parawixia dehaani (Doleschall, 1859) – India to Philippines, New Guinea
Parawixia d. octopunctigera (Strand, 1911) – Papua New Guinea (New Ireland)
Parawixia d. pygituberculata (Strand, 1911) – Papua New Guinea (New Ireland), Indonesia (Sulawesi)
Parawixia d. quadripunctigera (Strand, 1911) – Indonesia (Aru Is.)
Parawixia destricta (O. Pickard-Cambridge, 1889) – Mexico to Panama
Parawixia divisoria Levi, 1992 – Ecuador, Peru, Brazil, Bolivia
Parawixia guatemalensis (O. Pickard-Cambridge, 1889) – Mexico, Guatemala
Parawixia honesta (O. Pickard-Cambridge, 1899) – Mexico
Parawixia hoxaea (O. Pickard-Cambridge, 1889) – Guatemala to Panama
Parawixia hypocrita (O. Pickard-Cambridge, 1889) – Guatemala to Brazil
Parawixia inopinata Camargo, 1950 – Brazil
Parawixia kochi (Taczanowski, 1873) – Trinidad to Brazil, Guyana, French Guiana
Parawixia maldonado Levi, 1992 – Peru
Parawixia matiapa Levi, 1992 – Trinidad, Colombia, Peru, Brazil
Parawixia monticola (Keyserling, 1892) – Brazil
Parawixia nesophila Chamberlin & Ivie, 1936 – Costa Rica, Panama
Parawixia ouro Levi, 1992 – Peru, Brazil
Parawixia porvenir Levi, 1992 – Colombia
Parawixia rigida (O. Pickard-Cambridge, 1889) – Guatemala to Panama
Parawixia rimosa (Keyserling, 1892) – Costa Rica to Bolivia
Parawixia tarapoa Levi, 1992 – Ecuador, Peru, Brazil
Parawixia tomba Levi, 1992 – Peru, Brazil
Parawixia tredecimnotata F. O. Pickard-Cambridge, 1904 – Mexico to Belize, Greater Antilles
Parawixia undulata (Keyserling, 1892) – Brazil, Uruguay, Argentina
Parawixia velutina (Taczanowski, 1878) – Colombia to Argentina

References

Araneidae
Araneomorphae genera
Spiders of Asia
Spiders of Central America
Spiders of Mexico
Spiders of South America
Taxa named by Frederick Octavius Pickard-Cambridge